Plex is an American streaming media service and a client–server media player platform, made by Plex, Inc. The Plex Media Server organizes video, audio, and photos from a user's collections and from online services, and streams it to the players. The official clients and unofficial third-party clients run on mobile devices, smart TVs, streaming boxes, and in web apps.

History 

Plex began as a freeware hobby project in December 2007 when developer Elan Feingold created a media center application for his Apple Mac. He ported the media player XBMC (since renamed Kodi) to Mac OS X. Around the same time, Cayce Ullman and Scott Olechowskisoftware executives who had recently sold their previous company to Ciscowere also looking to port XBMC to OS X, and noticed Feingold's progress via XBMC online forums. They contacted him and offered support and funding, forming a three-person team in January 2008.

The team released early versions of the port, called OSXBMC, intended for eventual full integration into Mac OS X. The developers continued collaborating with the Linux-based XBMC project until May 21, 2008. Due to different goals and vision from the XBMC team, they soon forked the code to become Plex, and published it on GitHub. The OSXBMC code was kept roughly in sync with the upstream XBMC code.

In December 2009, the US-based Plex, Inc. was founded with Ullman as CEO and Feingold as CTO. At that time, Plex had 130 apps, the most popular of which were viewers for Apple Movies Trailers, YouTube, Hulu, Netflix, MTV Music Videos, BBC iPlayer, and Vimeo. Feingold declared Plex apps had been downloaded about one million times. , Plex had 65 employees. In December 2019, Plex, Inc. announced ad-supported video on demand (AVOD) of TV shows and movies available globally to free Plex accounts, from publishers including Warner Bros. Domestic Television Distribution, MGM, Lionsgate, Regency Enterprises and Legendary. , it had about 100 global employees.

Software 

Plex is a media player system with a client–server model. Plex Media Server (PMS) stores, organizes, and streams all content; the playback client applications run on myriad devices and web browsers.

PMS is the back-end component, free of charge. It can acquire content from files, iTunes, iPhoto, Aperture, or the Internet, and automatically organize them by metadata tags such as title, artist, album, genre, year, and popularity. It organizes audio and visual content from personal media libraries and streams it to the player, either on the same device or over a network. PMS can run on Windows, macOS, Linux, FreeBSD, NAS devices, or on Nvidia Shield TV.

The front-end player apps are Plex, Plex Web App, Plexamp, and Plex Dash. They allow the user to manage and play all content from PMS. Most apps are free of charge. The Plex app is the successor to the Plex Media Player, and runs on a multitude of platforms: Amazon Appstore, Android, Apple TV, Android TV, Chromecast, Roku, iOS, PlayStation, Sonos, Oculus Go, webOS, Tizen, Windows, Xbox, and macOS.

Streaming
Free Plex accounts can share personal media libraries among a user's own collection of devices or to friends, and access Plex, Inc.'s content library of ad-supported video on demand (AVOD) and free-to-stream live TV channels.
The publishing partners have included Tidal, Warner Bros. Television Studios, MGM, Lionsgate, Legendary, Crackle, Endemol Shine, Shout! Factory, Regency Enterprises, and Kidoodle TV. Plex Pass is the optional paid-subscription service including mobile synchronization, metadata fetching for music, multi-user support, parental controls, OTA live TV and DVR, trailers, extras, and cross-selling offers.

See also 
 Jellyfin, a fully open-source alternative to Plex
 Emby
 Kodi (software)
 Self-hosting (web services)
 Comparison of DVR software packages
 Comparison of video player software
 Home theater PC
 List of video players (software)
 RasPlex, Plex for Raspberry Pi

References

External links 
 

2009 software
Android (operating system) software
Internet television streaming services
IOS software
MacOS media players
Media servers
Online retailers of the United States
Software companies of the United States
Software forks
Streaming media systems
Streaming software
Subscription video on demand services
TvOS software
Universal Windows Platform apps
Windows media players
Advertising video on demand